Antônio dos Santos Cunha was a Portuguese or Brazilian composer who was active in São João del-Rei in Minas Gerais, Brazil, from 1800 to 1822. He was probably Portuguese but biographical details are lacking. S

Santos Cunha lived in São João del-Rei from 1786, when he was already an adult. He joined the Lay Carmelites in 1800. In 1815 he traveled to Lisbon, but the date of a presumed return to Brazil is unknown. His importance rests in the volume of sacred works he left marking the entry of romantic influence into the sacred music of the region.

Recordings
Responsorios para officio da Sexta-feira Santa - Ensemble Turicum, directed Silva and Weibel, K617

References

Brazilian composers
19th-century composers